The Ambassador from Israel to Zimbabwe is Israel's foremost diplomatic representative in Zimbabwe.

List of ambassadors

Gershon Gan 1994 – 1999
 Itzhak Gerberg 1999 – 2002
Ofra Farhi 2021-

References

Zimbabwe
Israel